The non-marine molluscs of Nepal are a complete molluscan fauna of Nepal (wildlife of Nepal, environment of Nepal), because Nepal is landlocked country.

A number of species of non-marine molluscs are found in the wild in Nepal.

Summary table of number of species
(Summary table is based on species counted in this list and include also those ones with question marks)

Land slug Limax seticus lives in altitudes 4,700–4,800 m a.s.l. in Nepal. It is the highest locality where occurrence of land slugs was recorded.

Freshwater gastropods 
Freshwater gastropods in Nepal include:

Amnicolidae
 Erhaia banepaensis Nesemann & S. Sharma in Nesemann et al., 2007
 Erhaia chandeshwariensis Nesemann & S. Sharma in Nesemann et al., 2007
 Erhaia sugurensis Nesemann, Shah & Tachamo in Nesemann et al., 2007

Viviparidae
 Bellamya bengalensis (Lamarck, 1822)

Ampullariidae
 Pila globosa (Swainsen, 1822)

Thiaridae
 Tarebia granifera (Lamarck, 1822)

Pachychilidae
 Brotia costula (Rafinesque, 1833)

Lymnaeidae
 Austropeplea viridis (Quoy & Gaimard, 1832)
 Lymnaea acuminata Lamarck, 1822
 Radix luteola (Lamarck, 1822)

Planorbidae
 Indoplanorbis exustus (Deshayes, 1834)
 Gyraulus convexiusculus (Hutton, 1849)

Land gastropods 
Land gastropods in Nepal include:

Alycaeidae
 Alycaeus burti Godwin-Austen, 1874
 Alycaeus lohitensis Godwin-Austen, 1914
 Alycaeus yamneyensis Godwin-Austen, 1914
 Chamalycaeus bicrenatus (Godwin-Austen, 1874)
 Chamalycaeus digitatus (H.F. Blanford, 1871)
 Chamalycaeus inflatus (Godwin-Austen, 1874)
 Chamalycaeus notatus (Godwin-Austen, 1876)
 Chamalycaeus otiphorus (Benson, 1858)
 Chamalycaeus plectochilus (Benson, 1859)
 Chamalycaeus strangulatus (L. Pfeiffer, 1846)
 Chamalycaeus stylifer (Benson, 1857)
 Chamalycaeus summus (Godwin-Austen, 1914)

Cyclophoridae
 Cyclophorus fulguratus (L. Pfeiffer, 1852)
 Cyclophorus pyrotrema Benson, 1854
 Cyclophorus aurantiacus (Schumacher, 1817) - doubtful
 Theobaldius sp.
 Scabrina phaenotopicus (Benson, 1851)
 Pterocyclos cf. brahmakundensis Godwin-Austen, 1915

Diplommatinidae
 Diplommatina abiesiana Budha & Naggs, 2017
 Diplommatina boessnecki Walther & Hausdorf, 2020
 Diplommatina exserta Godwin-Austen, 1886
 Diplommatina fistulata Budha & Naggs, 2017
 Diplommatina folliculus (L. Pfeiffer, 1846)
 Diplommatina godawariensis Budha & Naggs, 2017
 Diplommatina maipokhariensis Budha & Naggs, 2017
 Diplommatina miriensis Godwin-Austen, 1917
 Diplommatina munipurensis Godwin-Austen, 1892
 Diplommatina oviformis Fulton, 1901
 Diplommatina pachycheilus Benson, 1857
 Diplommatina regularis Fulton, 1901
 Diplommatina salgharica Budha & Backeljau, 2017
 Diplommatina shivapuriensis Budha & Backeljau, 2017
 Diplommatina silvicola Godwin-Austen, 1886
 Diplommatina sperata W. T. Blanford, 1862
 Diplommatina syabrubesiensis Budha & Backeljau, 2017

Pupinidae

Gastrocoptidae
 Gastrocopta huttoniana (Benson, 1849)

Pyramidulidae
 Pyramidula kuznetsovi Schileyko & Balashov, 2012

Valloniidae
 Vallonia costohimala Gerber & Bößneck, 2009
 Vallonia himalaevis Gerber & Bößneck, 2009
 Vallonia kathrinae Gerber & Bößneck, 2009
 Vallonia ladacensis (Nevill, 1878)
 Vallonia tenuilabris (Braun, 1843)

Limacidae
 Limax seticus Wiktor & Bössneck, 2004

Ariophantidae
 Khasiella pansa (Benson, 1856)
 Sarika dugasti (Morlet, 1891)

Achatinidae
 Achatina fulica (Férussac, 1821)
 Glessula orobia (Benson, 1860)
 Glessula cf. hebetata Godwin-Austen, 1920
 Glessula tamakoshi Budha & Backeljau, 2017
 Rishetia hastula (Benson, 1860)
 Rishetia kathmandica Budha & Backeljau, 2017
 Rishetia cf. mastersi Godwin-Austen, 1920
 Rishetia nagarjunensis Budha & Naggs, 2017
 Rishetia rishikeshi Budha & Naggs, 2017
 Rishetia subulata Budha & Naggs, 2017
 Rishetia tribhuvana Budha, 2017

Plectopylidae
 Endothyrella angulata Budha & Páll-Gergely, 2015
 Endothyrella dolakhaensis Budha & Páll-Gergely, 2015
 Endothyrella minor (Godwin-Austen, 1879)
 Endothyrella nepalica Budha & Páll-Gergely, 2015

Anadenidae
 Anadenus altivagus (Theobald, 1862)
 Anadenus kuznetsovi Kuzminykh & Schilyko, 2005
 Anadenus nepalensis Wiktor, 2001

Freshwater bivalves
Unionidae
 Lamellidens marginalis (Lamarck, 1819)

Amblemidae
 Parreysia corrugata (O. F. Müller, 1774)
 Parreysia flavidens deltae (Benson)
 Parreysia lima Simpson, 1900

See also
Lists of molluscs of surrounding countries:
 List of non-marine molluscs of China
 List of non-marine molluscs of India

References

External links 
  Bössneck U. (2006). "Ökologie und Verbreitung der Nacktschnecken im Nepal-Himalaya (Molluca: Gastropoda: Pulmonata)". In: Hartmann M. & Weipert J. (Eds) Biodiversität und Naturausstattung im Himalaya. Bandung 2: 39–48.
 Budha P. B. (2005). "Nepalese malacology trails behind “Catch up”". Himalayan Journal of Sciences 3(5): 9–10.
 Budha P. B., Mordan P. B., Naggs F. & Backeljau T. (2012). "Darwininitium – a new fully pseudosigmurethrous orthurethran genus from Nepal (Gastropoda, Pulmonata, Cerastidae)". ZooKeys 175: 19–26. .
 Khanal S. & Budha P. B. (2013). "Terrestrial gastropod fauna of Nagarjun forest, Shivapuri-Nagarjun National Park, Kathmandu, Nepal". Journal of Institute of Science and Technology, Tribhuvan University 18(1): 113–119.
 Kuznetsov A. G. (1996). "Himalodiscus aculeatus Kuznetsov, gen. et sp. nov. (Pulmonata, Endodontidae) from Nepal". Ruthenica 5(2): 163–165.
 Kuznetsov A. G. & Schileyko A. A. (1997). "New data on Enidae (Gastropoda, Pulmonata) of Nepal". Ruthenica 7(2): 133–140.
 Kuznetsov A. G. & Schileyko A. A. (1999). "Two new species of the genus Pupinidius Moellendorff, 1901 (Enidae, Pulmonata), and the distribution of the genus in Nepal". Ruthenica 9(2): 117–121.
 Limbu K. P., Subba B. R. & Rai B. K. (2???). "Nutritional Status of Three Species of Molluscs in Nepal". In: Gupta V .K., Verma A. K. & Singh G. D. (eds), pp. 232–239. Perspectives in animal ecology and reproduction, Edition: vol. 9, Chapter: 10, Daya Publishing House. PDF.
 Raut S. K. (1999). "The giant African land snail Achatina fulica Bowdich in Nepal and Bhutan". Journal of the Bombay Natural History Society 96(1): 173.
 Schileyko A. A. & Frank C. (1994). "Some terrestrial Mollusca of the Nepalesian fauna". Archiv für Molluskenkunde 123(1/6): 127–136.
 Subba B. R. (2003). "Molluscan checklist of Ghodaghodi Tal area, Kailali District". Our Nature 1: 1–2.
 Subba B. R. & Ghosh T. K. (2000). "Some freshwater molluscs from eastern and central Nepal". Journal of the Bombay Natural History Society 97(3): 452-455.
 Subba B. R. & Ghosh T. K. (2001). "Terrestrial mollusks from Nepal". Journal of the Bombay Natural History Society 98(1): 58–61.
 Subba B. R. & Ghosh T. K. (2008). "Report on some terrestrial molluscs from different regions of Nepal". Journal of Natural History Museum, Tribhuvan University 23: 78–81.
 Subba B. R., Limbu K. P. & Rai B. K. (2012). "Food value of edible molluscs of eastern Nepal:The lesser utilized food in Nepal". Lambert Academic Publishing, Germany, . PDF.

Molluscs
Nepal
Nepal